Bjørn Tidmand (born 24 January 1940 in Copenhagen) is a Danish singer, best known for his participation in the 1964 Eurovision Song Contest.  

After being a member of the Copenhagen Boys Choir as a child, Tidmand began performing in local nightclubs and signed a recording contract in 1959, having a hit with a Danish-language version of "Only Sixteen".  

In 1963, Tidmand took part in the Dansk Melodi Grand Prix to choose the country's Eurovision Song Contest entry, and finished in second place behind Grethe & Jørgen Ingmann, who went on to win that year's Eurovision for Denmark. The following year, Tidmand won the DMGP with the song "Sangen om dig" ("The Song About You"), which went on to the ninth Eurovision, held in his home city of Copenhagen on 21 March.  "Sangen om dig" finished the evening in ninth place of the 16 entries.

Tidmand went on to enjoy a string of hits in Denmark, while developing a parallel career as a television host in the 1970s and 1980s.  He remains active and continues touring and performing.

References

External links 
 

Danish male singers
Eurovision Song Contest entrants for Denmark
Eurovision Song Contest entrants of 1964
Musicians from Copenhagen
1940 births
Living people